The rutherford (symbol Rd) is a non-SI unit of radioactive decay. It is defined as the activity of a quantity of radioactive material in which one million nuclei decay per second. It is therefore equivalent to one megabecquerel, and one becquerel equals one microrutherford. One rutherford is equivalent to 2.703 × 10−5 curie.

The unit was introduced in 1946. It was named after British/New Zealand physicist and Nobel laureate Lord Ernest Rutherford (Nobel Prize in 1908), who was an early leader in the study of atomic nucleus disintegrations. After the becquerel was introduced in 1975 as the SI unit for activity, the rutherford became obsolete, and it is no longer commonly used.

Radiation related quantities
The following table shows radiation quantities in SI and non-SI units:

References 

Units of radioactivity